Lyamin is a Russian masculine surname. Its feminine counterpart is Lyamina. Notable people with the surname include:

Kirill Lyamin (born 1986), Russian ice hockey player

See also
Lyamin (river), a tributary of the Ob in Russia

Russian-language surnames